The Ultimate Monty Python Rip Off is a compilation album released by Monty Python in 1994 on the occasion of their 25th anniversary. The album contains no previously unreleased material and was released as a sampler for the simultaneous release of The Instant Monty Python CD Collection box set.

Track listing
Introduction
Finland
Travel Agent
I Like Chinese
French Taunter
Australian Table Wines
Spanish Inquisition (also contains Famous Person Quiz - not written on album track list)
The Galaxy Song
Every Sperm is Sacred
Grim Reaper
Sit on My Face
Argument (also contains Cheese Shop - not written on album track list)
Mary Queen of Scots
Four Yorkshiremen
Lumberjack Song
Albatross 
Nudge Nudge
Parrot
Bruces/Philosophers' Song
Fish Licence
Eric the Half-a-Bee
The Spam Song
Big Nose
Stoning
Link 1
Welease Wodger
Link 2
Always Look on the Bright Side of Life
Spanish Inquisition (Ending)

Distribution information
CD: (1994) Virgin Records, Ltd./Kay Gee Bee Music Ltd. CDV 2748 (UK)

References

Monty Python compilation albums
1994 compilation albums
Virgin Records compilation albums